Parchin is an Iranian military complex near Tehran.

Parchin may also refer to:
 Parchin, Ardabil
 Parchin-e Olya, Ardabil Province
 Parchin-e Sofla, Ardabil Province
 Parchin, Tehran
 Parchin, Zanjan